, abbreviated to , is a public university in Japan. It is located in Sumiyoshi-ku, Osaka. It is one of the most prestigious universities in Japan regarding Applied Linguistics.

The university will merge with Osaka Prefecture University to form Osaka Metropolitan University (OMU) in April 2022.

History 
It became Osaka Commercial School in 1885, then was municipalized in 1889. Osaka City was defeated in a bid to draw the Second National Commercial College (the winner was Kobe City), so the city authorities decided to establish a municipal commercial college without any aid from the national budget. In 1928, the college became , the first municipal university in Japan.

In 1901, the school was reorganized to become , later authorized under Specialized School Order in 1904. The college had grand brick buildings around the Taishō period.

In 1949 OCU had five faculties (Business / Economics / Law and Literature / Science and Engineering / Home Economics).
In 1953, the Faculty of Law and Literature was divided into two faculties.
In 1955, Osaka City Medical University was incorporated and became the Faculty of Medicine.
In 1959, the Faculty of Science and Engineering was divided into two faculties.
In 1975, the Faculty of Home Economics was reorganized into the Faculty of Human Life Science.
In 2003, the Graduate School of Creative Cities was established.
In 2006, the Urban Research Plaza and the Advanced Research Institute for Natural Science and Technology were established.
Due to financial problems in many cities, all of the municipal universities in Japan were requested to incorporate. OCU became a Public University Corporation in 2006.
In 2015 OCU celebrated its 135th anniversary.
In June 2020, OCU announced it would be merging with Osaka Prefecture University in a new university named University of Osaka. However, after the name was announced on June 26, 2020, Osaka University President released a statement pointing out that the English version of the new university's name was "remarkably similar" to that of Osaka University, adding, "It will cause confusion among our students, and work as a great obstacle for the future of both universities, which are reaching out to the world."

Organization

Undergraduate schools 
 Faculty of Business
 Faculty of Economics
 Faculty of Law
 Faculty of Literature and Human Sciences
 Faculty of Science
 Faculty of Engineering
 Faculty of Medicine
 School of Nursing
 Faculty of Human Life Science

Graduate schools 
 Graduate School of Business
 Graduate School of Economics
 Graduate School of Law
 Graduate School of Literature and Human Sciences
 Graduate School of Science
 Graduate School of Engineering
 Graduate School of Medicine
 Graduate School of Nursing
 Graduate School of Human Life Science
Graduate School of Urban Management
 Graduate School of Creative Cities

Institutes 
 Media Center and Library
Center of Education and Research for Disaster Management (CERD)
Research Center for Artificial Photosynthesis (ReCAP)
URA Center and Osaka City University Incubator
Center for Health Science Innovation (CHSI)
University Hospital
 Research Center for Urban Health and Sports
 Research Center for Human Rights
 Urban Research Plaza
 Center for Research and Development of Higher Education
 Research Center for Finance & Securities
 English Education Development Center
 Advanced Research Institute for Natural Science and Technology
 Botanical Gardens Faculty of Science Osaka City University; located in Katano)
 Toneyama Institute for Tuberculosis Research (a part of Medical School; located in Toyonaka)

Academic rankings

Evaluation from Business World

Notable alumni 

 Masao Abe, professor in religious studies
 Yoshi Amao, actor
 Hideo Hashimoto, soccer player
 Takafumi Isomura, former mayor of Osaka City
 Takeshi Kaikō, writer
 Otogo Kataoka, former president of Nomura Securities
 Takamaro Tamiya, a hijacker of Japan Airlines Flight 351
 Minoru Segawa, former president of Nomura Securities
 Shinya Yamanaka, Nobel Laureate in Physiology or Medicine 2012, the scientist who discovered the Induced Pluripotent Stem Cell
 Eiichi Yamashita, politician

References

External links 

 

Public universities in Japan
Education in Osaka
Osaka City University
Kansai Collegiate American Football League